The Gouldian finch (Chloebia gouldiae), also known as the Lady Gouldian finch, Gould's finch or the rainbow finch, is a colourful passerine bird that is native to Australia.

Taxonomy
The Gouldian finch was described by British ornithological artist John Gould in 1844 as Amadina gouldiae, in honour of his deceased wife Elizabeth. The specimens were sent to him by Benjamin Bynoe although they had been described some years before by Jacques Bernard Hombron and Honoré Jacquinot. It is also known as the rainbow finch, Gould's finch, or the Lady Gouldian finch and sometimes just Gould. The Gouldian finch is sister to the parrotfinches in the genus Erythrura.

Description
Both sexes are brightly coloured with black, green, yellow, and red markings. The females tend to be less brightly coloured. One major difference between the sexes is that the male's chest is purple, while the female's is a lighter mauve.

Gouldian finches are about 125–140 mm long. Gouldian finches' heads may be red, black, or yellow. Formerly considered three different kinds of finches, it is now known that these are colour variants that exist in the wild. Selective breeding has also developed mutations (blue, yellow and silver instead of a green back) in both body and breast colour.

There are several "prominent rounded tubercles" with an "opalescent lustre" at the back of the gape. These tubercles are commonly (and incorrectly) described as phosphorescent in spite of much scientific evidence to the contrary. It is believed that these tubercles simply reflect light and are not luminescent.

Distribution and habitat

Prior to the Australian government's ban on the export of Australian fauna, Gouldian finches were exported worldwide. These birds have resulted in viable breeding populations being held in many countries.

Conservation status
The number of Gouldian finches has decreased quite dramatically during the 20th century. Their habitat has been reduced or altered. Early research indicated a parasite called the air sac mite was responsible for the decline of the species. This is no longer considered to be a major factor. In general, Gouldian finches are susceptible to diseases and viral infections. Their beautiful colours mean that they are easily caught by predators. Fires are listed as the primary threat to the natural populations.

Behaviour
Outside the breeding season, Gouldian finches often join mixed flocks consisting of long-tailed finches and masked finches. Flocks can consist of up to 1,000–2,000 individuals. During the breeding season, they are normally found on rough scree slopes where vegetation is sparse. In the dry season, they are much more nomadic and will move to wherever their food and water can be found.

Feeding
Like other finches, the Gouldian finch is a seed eater. They eat up to 30% of their bodyweight each day. During the breeding season, Gouldian finches mainly feed on ripe and half-ripe grass seeds of sorghum. During the dry season, they mainly forage on the ground for seeds. During the wet season, spinifex grass seed (Triodia sp.) is an important part of their diet. So far Gouldians have been recorded eating six different species of grass seed, but researchers have yet to find evidence of insect consumption.

Breeding

Gouldian finches will usually make their nests in tree-holes. They usually breed in the early part of the dry season, when there is plenty of food around. When a male is courting a female, he bobs about and ruffles his feathers in an attempt to show off his bright colors. He will expand his chest and fluff out the feathers on his forehead. After mating, the female will lay a clutch of about 4–8 eggs. Both parents help brood the eggs during the daytime, and it is the female who stays on the eggs at night. When the eggs hatch, both parents care for the young. Gouldian finches leave the nest after between 19 and 23 days and are completely independent at 40 days old.

Gouldian finches have brightly coloured gapes and call loudly when the parent birds return so that they are able to find and feed their mouths in the dark nest.

It has been shown that female Gouldian finches from Northern Australia can control the sex of their offspring by choosing mates according to their head color. A certain amount of genetic incompatibility between black and red-headed birds can result in high mortality (up to 80%) in female offspring when birds of different head colours mate. If the female mates with a finch of different head colour, this genetic incompatibility can be addressed by over-producing sons, up to a ratio of four males to one female. This is one of the first proven instances of birds biasing the sex of their offspring to overcome genetic weaknesses.

Aviculture
Gouldian finches are a popular species in aviculture because of their striking colors and low care requirements. Gouldian finches get along well with other species of grass finch and some other docile species of bird, such as waxbills and parrot finches.

Trapping for aviculture 
In the Kimberley District of Western Australia, where most wild Gouldian finch were trapped for aviculture, it was often reported as one of the more common of the eleven finch species.  Until 1977, it was trapped in greater numbers than any other finch.  From 1897, when finch trapping started in the Kimberley, it was the most sought after finch by trappers and the most desired by fanciers.  Between the years 1934 and 1939, the Gouldian finch was the most exported single finch species.  The Perth Zoo exported 22,064 finches of which 12,509 were Gouldian.  Private dealers exported 35,315 finches, of which 14,504 were Gouldian.  The number of finches taken in the 1958 finch trapping season was the largest for one year, of the 38,649 finches taken, 11,286 were Gouldian.  The last licensed trapping of Gouldian finch in Western Australia was on 15 November 1981.  In that year's finch trapping season, of the 23,450 finches taken 1,054 were Gouldian. However, it is now illegal to export these birds from Australia.

Gallery

Gouldian finch mutations

References

External links

BirdLife Species Factsheet 
Courtship dance of the male Gouldian finch (video)

Domesticated birds
Gouldian finch
Birds of the Northern Territory
Birds of Western Australia
Endangered fauna of Australia
Nature Conservation Act endangered biota
Gouldian finch
Gouldian finch